Oil and gas production, tourism, and federal government spending are important drivers of New Mexico's economy. The state government has an elaborate system of tax credits and technical assistance to promote job growth and business investment, especially in new technologies.

In 2017 New Mexico's gross domestic product was $94.2 billion.

In 2017 the per capita personal income was $39,811 (ranked 48th in the nation).

In 2008 the percentage of persons below the poverty level was 17.1%.

Major industries and products

Agriculture and mining
Cattle and dairy products top the list of major animal products of New Mexico. Cattle, sheep, and other livestock graze most of the arable land of the state throughout the year.

Limited, scientifically controlled dryland farming prospers alongside cattle ranching. Major crops include hay, nursery stock, pecans, and chile peppers. Hay and sorghum top the list of major dryland crops. Farmers also produce onions, potatoes, and dairy products. New Mexico specialty crops include piñon nuts, pinto beans, and chiles.

The Carlsbad and Fort Sumner reclamation projects on the Pecos River and the nearby Tucumcari project provide adequate water for limited irrigation in those areas of the desert and semiarid portions of the state where scant rainfall evaporates rapidly, generally leaving insufficient water supplies for large-scale irrigation. Located upstream of Las Cruces, the Elephant Butte Reservoir provides a major irrigation source for the extensive farming along the Rio Grande. Other irrigation projects use the Colorado River basin and the San Juan River.

Lumber mills in Albuquerque process pinewood, the chief commercial wood of the rich timber economy of Northern New Mexico.

New Mexicans derive much of their income from mineral extraction. Even before European exploration, Native Americans mined turquoise for making jewelry. After the Spanish introduced refined silver alloys they were incorporated into the Indian jewelry designs. New Mexico produces uranium ore (see Uranium mining in New Mexico), manganese ore, potash, salt, perlite, copper ore, beryllium, and tin concentrates.

Energy

New Mexico is rich in fossil fuel and alternative energy resources. Major petroleum and natural gas deposits are located in the Permian Basin in southeast New Mexico and in the San Juan Basin in the northwest. The San Juan Basin Gas Area is the largest field of proved natural gas reserves in the United States. According to the Energy Information Administration, State crude oil output is typically just over 3 percent of the annual U.S. total, and natural gas output is nearly 10 percent of the U.S. total. New Mexico also contains major coal deposits in the northwest corner of the State. The boom in hydraulic fracturing and horizontal drilling beginning in the mid-2010s led to a large increase in the production of crude oil from the Permian Basin and other U.S. sources; these developments allowed the United States to again become the world's largest producer of crude oil, in 2018. New Mexico's oil and gas operations contribute to the state's above-average release of the greenhouse gas methane, including from a national methane hot spot in the Four Corners area. Nine tenths of electricity production in the State is from coal-fired plants. Much of New Mexico's geologically-active Rocky Mountain region holds geothermal power potential, and pockets of the State are suitable for wind power development. New Mexico's southern deserts offer the State's most concentrated solar power potential.

The Waste Isolation Pilot Plant (WIPP) is located in the Delaware Basin, and is used to store nuclear waste.

Source:

Manufacturing
Industrial output, centered around Albuquerque, includes electric equipment; petroleum and coal products; food processing; printing and publishing; and stone, glass, and clay products. Defense-related industries include ordnance. Important high-technology industries include lasers, data processing, solar energy and semiconductors.

Government and military
Federal government spending is a major driver of the New Mexico economy. In 2005 the federal government spent $2.03 on New Mexico for every dollar of tax revenue collected from the state. This rate of return is higher than any other state in the United States. The federal government is also a major employer in New Mexico providing more than a quarter of the state's jobs.

Many of the federal jobs relate to the military; the state hosts three air force bases (Kirtland Air Force Base, Holloman Air Force Base, and Cannon Air Force Base); a testing range (White Sands Missile Range); and an army proving ground and maneuver range (Fort Bliss – McGregor Range).

In addition to the National Guard, New Mexico has a New Mexico State Defense Force. Other minor locations include the New Mexico Army National Guard Headquarters in Santa Fe county and the National Guard Armory in far northern Rio Rancho in Sandoval county.

Other federal installations include national observatories and the technology labs of Los Alamos National Laboratory (LANL) and Sandia National Laboratories (SNL). SNL conducts electronic and industrial research on Kirtland AFB, on the southeast side of Albuquerque. These installations also include the missile and spacecraft proving grounds at White Sands. Other federal agencies such as the National Park Service, the United States Forest Service, and the United States Bureau of Land Management are a big part of the state's rural employment base.

Tourism and Retirement
Virgin Galactic, the first space tourism company to develop commercial flights into space, has decided to put its world headquarters and mission control at Spaceport America in Upham, New Mexico (25 miles (40 km) south of Truth or Consequences); Virgin Galactic had its inaugural launch of the VSS Enterprise spaceship in 2008, and has begun launching ordinary citizens since early 2009.

The New Mexico Tourism Department estimates that in fiscal year 2006 the travel industry in New Mexico generated expenditures of $6.5 billion.

The private service economy in urban New Mexico, especially in Albuquerque, has boomed in recent decades. Since the end of World War II, the city has gained an ever-growing number of retirees, especially among armed forces veterans and government workers. It is also increasingly gaining notice as a health-conscious community, and contains many hospitals and a high per capita number of massage and alternative therapists. The warm, semiarid climate has contributed to the exploding population of Albuquerque, attracting new industries to New Mexico. By contrast, many heavily Indigenous American and Hispanic rural communities remain economically underdeveloped.

Film and television

Feature films have used New Mexico as a location since The Indian School in 1898. Financial incentives and construction of facilities (such as The Albuquerque Studios) have created opportunities for locally based crew members with production reaching an all-time high in 2007. As of the end of August 2007, 30 major projects have been filmed in the state, more than in any other calendar year in history. The New Mexico Film Office assists the industry in coming to and filming in the state.

In 2011 the state placed a cap of $50 million on tax credits for the film industry. The cost of funding the incentive soared from just $3.4 million in 2004 to $76.7 million in 2009.

Facilities
Garson Studios is an established film production facility is on the campus of Santa Fe University of Art and Design that has helped turn out many feature-length films with its soundstage and high tech equipment.

Film and television post-production is also growing

Taxes
Beginning in 2008, personal income tax rates for New Mexico range from 1.7% to 4.9%, within four income brackets.
Beginning in 2007, active-duty military salaries are exempt from the state income tax.

New Mexico imposes a gross receipts tax on businesses. This resembles a sales tax but unlike the sales taxes in many states it applies to services as well as tangible goods. Normally the business passes the tax on to the purchaser. There is a tax imposed by the state and there may also be local taxes imposed by counties and cities.
As of July 1, 2008, the combined tax rate ranged from 5.125% to 8.4375%.

Property tax is imposed on real property by the state, by counties, and by school districts. In general personal property is not taxed. The taxable value of property is 1/3 of the assessed value. A tax rate of about 30 mills is applied to the taxable value, resulting in an effective tax rate of about 1%. In the 2005 tax year the average millage was about 26.47 for residential property and 29.80 for non-residential property. Assessed values of residences cannot be increased by more than 3% per year unless the residence is remodeled or sold.

Economic incentives
New Mexico provides a number of economic incentives to businesses operating in the state, including various types of tax credits and tax exemptions. Most of the incentives are based on job creation.

New Mexico law allows governments to provide land, buildings, and infrastructure to businesses to promote job creation. Several municipalities have imposed an economic development gross receipts tax (a form of municipal infrastructure GRT) that is used to pay for these infrastructure improvements and for marketing their areas.

The state provides financial incentives for film production. The New Mexico Film Office estimated at the end of 2007 that the incentive program had brought more than 85 film projects to the state since 2003 and had added $1.2 billion to the economy.

Largest employers
(Not ranked by size)
 Northern
 Santa Fe University of Art and Design
 Boy Scouts of America
 U.S. Bureau of Land Management (BLM)
 Mesa Air Group
 Navajo Nation
 Los Alamos National Laboratory
 Wal-Mart
 New Mexico State Government
 New Mexico Department of Transportation
 Northern New Mexico College
 Central
 PNM Resources and PNM Electric & Gas Services
 Presbyterian Health Plan
 Sandia National Laboratories
 Intel
 University of New Mexico
 New Mexico State Government
 Kirtland Air Force Base
 Eastern
 Albertson's Supermarket
 U.S. Postal Service
 Wal-Mart
 Navajo Refining Company
 U.S. National Park Service (NPS)
 Allsup's Convenience Stores
 Southwestern
 Immigration and Naturalization Service (INS)
 Lockheed Engineering and Sciences
 New Mexico State University
 Lovelace Healthcare
 Pepsi Bottling
 New Mexico Institute of Mining and Technology
 U.S. Army (Fort Bliss)

 Source: Economic Research & Analysis Bureau New Mexico Department of Labor

Notes